
Gmina Kartuzy is an urban-rural gmina (administrative district) in Kartuzy County, Pomeranian Voivodeship, in northern Poland.

The gmina contains part of the protected area called Kashubian Landscape Park.

Villages
Apart from the town of Kartuzy, Gmina Kartuzy contains the villages and settlements of:

 Bącz
 Bernardówka
 Bór-Okola
 Borowiec
 Borowo
 Brodnica Dolna
 Brodnica Górna
 Bukowa Góra
 Burchardztwo
 Bylowo-Leśnictwo
 Chojna
 Cieszonko
 Dzierżążno
 Dzierżążno-Leśnictwo
 Głusino
 Grzebieniec
 Grzybno
 Grzybno Górne
 Kaliska
 Kalka
 Kamienna Góra
 Kamionka
 Kamionka Brodnicka
 Kępa
 Kiełpino
 Kolonia
 Kosy
 Kozłowy Staw
 Krzewino
 Łapalice
 Lesińce
 Leszno
 Melgrowa Góra
 Mezowo
 Mirachowo
 Młyńsko
 Mokre Łąki
 Nowa Huta
 Nowinki
 Nowiny
 Olszowe Błoto
 Ostowo
 Pieczyska
 Pikarnia
 Pomieczyńska Huta
 Prokowo
 Prokowskie Chrósty
 Przybród
 Przytoki
 Raj
 Ręboszewo
 Sarnówko
 Sarnowo
 Sianowo
 Sianowo Leśne
 Sianowska Huta
 Sitno
 Smętowo Chmieleńskie
 Smętowo Leśne
 Smolne Błoto
 Staniszewo
 Stara Huta
 Stążki
 Strysza Buda
 Sytna Góra
 Szade Góry
 Szklana Huta
 Szotowo
 Ucisko
 Złota Góra

Neighbouring gminas
Gmina Kartuzy is bordered by the gminas of Chmielno, Linia, Przodkowo, Sierakowice, Somonino, Stężyca, Szemud and Żukowo.

References
Polish official population figures 2006

Kartuzy
Kartuzy County